Cephalotes varians is a species of arboreal ant of the genus Cephalotes, characterized by an odd shaped head and the ability to "parachute" by steering their fall if they drop off of the tree they are on. This ability makes them one of several species known as gliding ants.

References

varians